Hossein Rezazadeh (born 1978) is an Iranian politician and retired weightlifter.

Rezazadeh may also refer to:

Rezazadeh Stadium, named after Hossein Rezazadeh
Reza Zadeh, a Canadian-Iranian computer scientist
Rezz, (born Isabelle Rezazadeh) Canadian musician